"Bite Your Lip (Get Up and Dance!)" is a song co-written by English musician Elton John with lyrics by Bernie Taupin. It is the closing track of his 1976 album, Blue Moves. It came out as a single two months after the release of the album. The US b-side was another album track, "Chameleon", which was also featured on the "Crazy Water" single that only came out in the UK, only four days later, but the UK release of 'Bite Your Lip' was released as a double-A side single, which was backed with 'Chicago' by Kiki Dee, making the release a joint chart effort. The single peaked at No. 28 in both the U.S. and the UK.

Lyrical meaning
The song is a party-song. It mentions various places. There is a choir singing throughout most of the song. It could be put in the same vein as disco, but also uses rock and roll, gospel, and pop elements.

Musical structure
The song opens with Elton on piano, and then kicks off to the beat, with the song's first of two slide guitar solos by Davey Johnstone along with the heavy percussion rhythms of Ray Cooper. The rest of the band notably includes, among others, Caleb Quaye. The song begins to turn into a jam after about the first two minutes, prominently including a choir of singers chanting "Bite your lip – get up – (get up) – get up and dance – bite your lip – get up – (get up – get up and dance – bite your lip – get up – get up and dance, dance, dance! (Dance, dance...) (Dance, dance, daaaaaance!)". Like the amount of vocals, the amount of instrumentation increases significantly during this portion, but with John on piano, the piano is obviously the dominant instrument; there are three piano solos in the song. As a result of the musical free-for-all, the song is six minutes and forty-three seconds, making it one of John's longest.

Performances
The song closed his "last" concert in 1977, which featured Stevie Wonder on stage. He also played it dressed as Donald Duck at the free concert in Central Park in 1980. The most recent performance dates from 2004, the first time since his throat surgery. The song was played as part of his tour for Peachtree Road but played in just a handful of concerts and then dropped from the set (a performance was later issued as a B-side of the "Electricity" single).

Reception
Billboard described "Bite Your Lip (Get Up and Dance!)" as an "all -out disco rocker" and praised its "dynamic and cheerful energy."  Cash Box said that it "falls somewhere between hard-driving boogie and more conventional disco productions" and that "the grand finale utilizes orchestra and repeated chorus, while the basic rhythm section, especially John at the piano, cooks as if in live performance." Record World said of the single that "Elton's raving disco-styled number...has been edited and given a Tom Moulton mix for maximum danceability."

Personnel
 Elton John – piano, lead vocals
 Davey Johnstone – slide guitar, backing vocals
 Caleb Quaye – rhythm guitar, backing vocals
 Kenny Passarelli – bass
 Roger Pope – drum kit
 James Newton-Howard – synthesizers
 Ray Cooper – bongos and congas

With:
 The Cornerstone Institutional Baptist and Southern California Community choirs (5 males and 16 females) 
 The Gene Page Strings: five wide cellos, two normal cellos, six violins, and two violas)

Instrument with uncredited players: additional rhythm guitar; bongo and conga set; pair of tambourines; vibraphone; French horn; trumpet; trombone; flute

References

Songs about dancing
Elton John songs
1976 songs
1977 singles
Songs with lyrics by Bernie Taupin
Songs with music by Elton John
Song recordings produced by Gus Dudgeon
DJM Records singles
MCA Records singles